Jacob Mollison is an Australian rules football umpire currently officiating in the Australian Football League.

Before umpiring in the AFL, he umpired in the 2002, 2003 and 2004 Ovens & Murray Football League Grand Finals and the 2006 and 2007 Victorian Football League (VFL) Grand Finals. He was the VFL umpire of the year in 2007. He was appointed to the AFL list in 2008 and made his debut in Round 6 of that year, in a match between the Western Bulldogs and West Coast. Mollison was appointed to his first AFL Grand Final in 2021.

References

Living people
Australian Football League umpires
Year of birth missing (living people)